Adelphicos ibarrorum  is a species of colubrid snake. It is endemic to Guatemala and only known from the highlands of south-central Guatemala in the region of its type locality near Chichicastenango. It is threatened by deforestation for agricultural purposes.

References

Adelphicos
Snakes of Central America
Reptiles of Guatemala
Endemic fauna of Guatemala
Reptiles described in 1988
Taxa named by Jonathan A. Campbell